Kevin McDonald (born 1961) is a Canadian comedian and actor.

Kevin McDonald or MacDonald may also refer to:

Kevin McDonald (bishop) (born 1947), Roman Catholic Archbishop of Southwark, England
Kevin McDonald (footballer, born 1981), retired Scottish footballer
Kevin McDonald (footballer, born 1985), English footballer
Kevin McDonald (footballer, born 1988), Scottish footballer
Kevin McDonald (rugby league) (1936–2014), Australian rugby player
Kevin MacDonald (artist) (1947–2006), Washington, DC-based artist 
Kevin Macdonald (director) (born 1967), Scottish film director
Kevin MacDonald (evolutionary psychologist) (born 1944), American white supremacist, conspiracy theorist, and evolutionary psychologist
Kevin MacDonald (footballer) (born 1960), Scottish football player for Liverpool
Kevin MacDonald (ice hockey) (born 1966), Canadian ice hockey player
Kevin McDonald (hurler)

See also
Keven McDonald (born 1956), American basketball player